Ardit Shaqiri (born 4 May 1985, in Struga) is a retired Macedonian-Albanian football midfielder.

Personal life
He is the cousin of former Macedonian international Artim Šakiri.

External links

1985 births
Living people
Sportspeople from Struga
Albanian footballers from North Macedonia
Association football midfielders
Macedonian footballers
KF Teuta Durrës players
FK Karaorman players
HNK Vukovar '91 players
KS Gramozi Ersekë players
MFK Ružomberok players
FK Ohrid players
FK Korab players
FK Drita players
KF Shkëndija players
FK Sloboda Tuzla players
FK Mladost Carev Dvor players
FC Struga players
Kategoria Superiore players
First Football League (Croatia) players
Slovak Super Liga players
Macedonian First Football League players
Macedonian Second Football League players
Premier League of Bosnia and Herzegovina players
Macedonian expatriate footballers
Expatriate footballers in Albania
Macedonian expatriate sportspeople in Albania
Expatriate footballers in Croatia
Macedonian expatriate sportspeople in Croatia
Expatriate footballers in Slovakia
Macedonian expatriate sportspeople in Slovakia
Expatriate footballers in Bosnia and Herzegovina
Macedonian expatriate sportspeople in Bosnia and Herzegovina
Expatriate footballers in Switzerland
Macedonian expatriate sportspeople in Switzerland